Chudoslavice is a municipality and village in Litoměřice District in the Ústí nad Labem Region of the Czech Republic. It has about 200 inhabitants.

Administrative parts
The village of Myštice is an administrative part of Chudoslavice.

References

Villages in Litoměřice District